Khaepa Kali Tala is a temple situated at Katwa, Malo Pada near the Gouranga Baddi. Mostly a temple of Hindu Goddess Kali, this temple also comprises a number of other temples, including that of Shiva, the most important deity of Hinduism. Although this temple was set up in the 1970s but the Khaepa Kali was established there by the dacoits long ago.

Major Locations
The temple is composed of;
 The temple of Lord Shiva
 The temple of Bhisnu
 The principle temple of Maa Kaali
 The Durga Mandir
 The Hari Mancha

References

Kali temples
Hindu temples in West Bengal
Buildings and structures in Purba Bardhaman district